Chiang Kai-hsin (born 25 December 1990) is a Taiwanese badminton player. In 2007, she reached the girls' doubles semifinal at the World Junior Championships in Waitakere City, New Zealand, winning the bronze medal. In 2009, she won bronze at the East Asian Games in the women's team event. In 2015, she represented National Taiwan Normal University at the World University Badminton Championships in Gwangju, South Korea and won the silver medal in the mixed doubles event. She was also the women's doubles semifinalist at the 2009 and 2014 Vietnam Open Grand Prix tournament.

Achievements

Summer Universiade 
Mixed doubles

BWF World Junior Championships 
Girls' doubles

Asian Junior Championships 
Mixed doubles

References

External links
 

Taiwanese female badminton players
1990 births
Living people
Badminton players at the 2010 Asian Games
Universiade medalists in badminton
Universiade silver medalists for Chinese Taipei
Universiade bronze medalists for Chinese Taipei
Asian Games competitors for Chinese Taipei
Medalists at the 2013 Summer Universiade
Medalists at the 2015 Summer Universiade